The 2015–16 Stony Brook Seawolves men's basketball team represented Stony Brook University in the 2015–16 NCAA Division I men's basketball season. The Seawolves were led by the eleventh-year head coach Steve Pikiell and played their home games at Island Federal Credit Union Arena. They were members of the America East Conference. They finished the season 26–7, 14–2 in America East play to win the regular-season championship. They defeated UMBC, Hartford, and Vermont to become champions of the America East tournament and earn the conference's automatic bid goes the NCAA tournament, their first in school history. As a #13 seed, the Seawolves fell to Kentucky in the first round.

On March 20, it was announced that head coach Steve Pikiell would leave the school to accept the job as the new head coach for Rutgers. He finished at Stony Brook with an eleven-year record of 192–157.

Previous season
The Seawolves finished the 2014–15 season 23–12, 12–4 in America East play to finish in a tie for second place. They advanced to the championship game of the America East tournament where they lost to Albany. They were invited to the College Basketball Invitational where they lost in the first round to Mercer.

Departures

Incoming Transfers

2015 incoming recruits

2016 incoming recruits

Roster

Schedule

|-
!colspan=9 style="background:#; color:white;"| Non-conference regular season

|-
!colspan=9 style="background:#; color:white;"| America East regular season

|-
!colspan=9 style="background:#; color:white;"| America East tournament

|-
!colspan=9 style="background:#; color:white;"| NCAA tournament

Rankings

References

Stony Brook Seawolves men's basketball seasons
Stony Brook
Stony Brook Seawolves men's b
Stony Brook Seawolves men's b
Stony Brook